Osterley is an affluent district of the historic parish of Isleworth in west London approximately  from Charing Cross and is part of the London Borough of Hounslow.  Most of its land use is mixed agricultural and aesthetic parkland at Osterley House (National Trust), charity-run, much of which is open to paying visitor access.

Osterley is on the most elevated soil of the parish, dissected by A4 (The Great West Road) and extends further north than the M4 Motorway. Syon Lane forms the border to the east, while the border with the town of Heston is to the west. Osterley extends to the south of the A4 to at least Church Road based on house deeds, much housing existed before mid 1930s and before the A4, St Mary's Church south of the A4 is also in Osterley.
 
Most of the land of Osterley is the large ancestral private estate of Osterley Park (one of the largest open spaces in west London) and its mansion. These were formerly owned by the Jersey family and were used during World War II as the home for Tom Wintringham's Home Guard training school. They are now National Trust property. During the inter-war period of the 1930s when the Great West Road was completed ribbon development housing appeared, and this gradually expanded to form the comparatively small residential sections within Osterley.

Besides Osterley House and Park, the district is also known for one of the London residences of The Sultan of Brunei (The Aviary Farm in Windmill Lane).

The electoral ward of Osterley and Spring Grove now has its own dedicated police team as part of the Metropolitan Police Safer Neighbourhoods programme.

Sport and Leisure

Osterley has a non-League football club CB Hounslow United F.C. who play at the Osterley Sports Ground.

Demography and housing 
In the 2011 Census, the Osterley ward was recorded as being 30% White British. Other significant ethnic groups were Other Whites (12.8%) and Indians. The proportion who ethnically identify as BAME (Black, Asian and minority Ethnic) was 54.4% of the population.

51.9% of people living in Osterley were born in the U.K. The other most common countries of birth were India (12.7%), Pakistan (2.8%), Kenya (2.2%), Ireland (1.8%), and North Africa (1.3%).

The largest religious affiliations in Isleworth are Christians (39.2%), Muslims (13.8%), Hindus (13.7%), those with no religion (11.9%), and Sikhs (11.8%).

Transport and locale

Nearest places
Kew Gardens is approximately 20 minutes away.

Nearest tube station 
 Osterley tube station

Nearest railway stations 
 Syon Lane railway station
 Isleworth railway station

References

Areas of London
Districts of the London Borough of Hounslow
Places formerly in Middlesex